Incamys is an extinct genus of chinchillid rodent that lived during the Late Oligocene (Deseadan) in what is now South America. Fossils of this genus have been found in the Salla Formation of Bolivia and the Agua de la Piedra and Sarmiento Formations of Argentina.

Taxonomy 
Incamys was first described by Hoffstetter and Lavocat, based on remains found in the Salla Formation of Bolivia, with the proposed type species being Incamys bolivianus, referring to the country it was found in. Later, in 1976, a new species was named, I. pretiosus, which was subsequently found to be a junior synonym of the type species. In 2015, Vucetich and colleagues described a new species of Incamys, I. menniorum, from the Sarmiento Formation of Chubut Province, Argentina.

The following cladogram of the Caviomorpha is based on Busker et al. 2020, showing the position of Incamys.

References 

Chinchillidae
Oligocene rodents
Oligocene mammals of South America
Deseadan
Paleogene Argentina
Fossils of Argentina
Paleogene Bolivia
Fossils of Bolivia
Fossil taxa described in 1970
Prehistoric rodent genera
Golfo San Jorge Basin
Sarmiento Formation